Shake Me may refer to:

Shake Me!, album by Scottish band The Kaisers
"Shake Me", song by Cinderella from Night Songs 1987
"Shake Me", song by Millencolin from Da Strike EP
"Shake Me", song by Bluesmobile	1989
"Shake Me", song by Gitte Hænning 1977
"Shake Me", song by Killer (Swiss band)  	1981
"Shake Me", song by Sheila and B. Devotion	1978